The Gravity Group is a wooden roller coaster design firm based in Cincinnati, Ohio, United States. The firm was founded in July 2002 out of the engineering team of the famed but now defunct Custom Coasters International. The core group of designers and engineers at The Gravity Group have backgrounds in civil, structural and mechanical engineering.  Their experience comes from work on over 40 different wooden roller coasters around the world.  The first coaster designed under the Gravity Group opened as Hades at Mount Olympus Theme Park in 2005. The Gravity Group also designed The Voyage at Holiday World in Santa Claus, Indiana, which opened in May 2006 and is the second-longest wooden roller coaster in the world.  These first two accomplishments of the team have been received with great success by both the industry and coaster enthusiasts alike.

In 2007, The Gravity Group opened Boardwalk Bullet, an intense wooden roller coaster that was built at Kemah Boardwalk and opened as the only wooden coaster in the Greater Houston area. The Gravity Group designed Ravine Flyer II at Waldameer in Erie, Pennsylvania, which was opened at the start of the 2008 season. In 2009 Fireball was opened at Happy Valley in China, becoming China's first wooden roller coaster. In 2011 Quassy Amusement Park opened Wooden Warrior, the company's sixth wooden roller coaster. The Gravity Group was also involved in the rebuilding of Libertyland's Zippin Pippin at Bay Beach Amusement Park in Green Bay, Wisconsin.

In 2008, members of The Gravity Group announced the development of their own wooden coaster trains called Timberliners.  They are being produced by Gravitykraft Corporation, a sister company to The Gravity Group.  The Gravity Group promotes their trains as the only wooden coaster trains capable of steering through curves, resulting in a more comfortable and maintenance-friendly ride.  Timberliners were planned to debut on The Voyage at Holiday World for the 2010 season, but after four years of delays, Holiday World officially cancelled the project on August 16, 2013.  However, in 2011, the Timberliners appeared on Wooden Warrior at Quassy Amusement Park in Connecticut and on Twister at Gröna Lund in Sweden, and in 2013 were added to Hades as part of its transformation to Hades 360.

List of roller coasters

As of 2019, The Gravity Group has built 28 roller coasters around the world.

References

External links

 The Gravity Group

Roller coaster manufacturers
American companies established in 2002
Manufacturing companies established in 2002
Manufacturing companies based in Cincinnati
2002 establishments in Ohio